Parliamentary elections were held in the Slovak Socialist Republic on 26 and 27 November 1971 alongside national elections. All 150 seats in the National Council were won by the National Front.

Results

References

1971 elections in Czechoslovakia
Parliamentary elections in Slovakia
Legislative elections in Czechoslovakia
Czechoslovakia
One-party elections
November 1971 events in Europe
Election and referendum articles with incomplete results